Sir Paul James Walker (born 1954), styled The Hon. Mr Justice Walker, was a High Court judge.

He was educated at St Peter's College, Adelaide and Magdalen College, Oxford.

He was called to the bar at Gray's Inn in 1979 and became a bencher there in 2005. He was made a QC in 1999, and judge of the High Court of Justice (Queen's Bench Division) since 2004. In 2019, he retired from the bench and returned to practice.

References

1954 births
Living people
People educated at St Peter's College, Adelaide
Alumni of Magdalen College, Oxford
Members of Gray's Inn
Queen's Bench Division judges
Knights Bachelor